Bozo: The World's Most Famous Clown is a 1958–1962 American animated television series based on the children's record book series, Bozo the Clown by Capitol Records. This series was produced by Larry Harmon Pictures, which began syndication in 1958. Lou Scheimer, of Filmation fame, was the art director for the series. The voice cast includes Larry Harmon starring as Bozo, with Paul Frees as the narrator.

A total of 157 five-minute shorts were produced: 20 in 1958, 85 in 1959 and 52 in 1962.

Summary
The animated adventures of Bozo and his young sidekick Butch as they journey to crazy, wild and exciting places.

Episode list

References

External links

1950s American animated television series
1960s American animated television series
1958 American television series debuts
1962 American television series endings
American children's animated comedy television series
Circus television shows
American television shows based on children's books
Animation based on real people
Cultural depictions of American men
Cultural depictions of comedians
First-run syndicated television programs in the United States
Television shows about clowns
1958 in animation
Bozo the Clown